The Acolyte is an upcoming American television series created by Leslye Headland. It is part of the Star Wars franchise, set at the end of the High Republic era before the events of the main Star Wars films.

Amandla Stenberg and Lee Jung-jae star in the leading roles. Headland expressed interest in working on the Star Wars franchise by the end of 2019, and was developing a new series for Lucasfilm by April 2020. The series title was announced in December, and filming began in October 2022. The eight-episode series will be released on Disney+ in 2024.

Premise 
The Acolyte is set at the end of the High Republic era in a world of "shadowy secrets and emerging dark side powers", approximately 100 years before Star Wars: Episode I – The Phantom Menace (1999). A former Padawan reunites with her Jedi Master to investigate a series of crimes, but the forces they confront are more sinister than they ever anticipated.

Cast 
 Amandla Stenberg as a former padawan
 Lee Jung-jae
 Manny Jacinto
 Dafne Keen
 Jodie Turner-Smith
 Rebecca Henderson
 Charlie Barnett
 Dean-Charles Chapman
 Carrie-Anne Moss
 Margarita Levieva

Production

Development 
At the premiere of Star Wars: The Rise of Skywalker (2019), television writer Leslye Headland was asked about her interest in the Star Wars franchise and revealed that she was a big fan with many ideas for Star Wars films that she wanted to make if she was asked to by Lucasfilm president Kathleen Kennedy. By April 2020, Headland was attached to write and serve as showrunner on a new female-centric Star Wars series for the streaming service Disney+. Staffing for the series had begun by then, and it was expected to be set in a different part of the franchise's timeline from other Star Wars projects. Lucasfilm confirmed Headland's series was in development on May 4, 2020, Star Wars Day. At Disney's Investor Day event on December 10, Kennedy announced that the series was titled The Acolyte, and would be set at the end of the High Republic era before the events of the main Star Wars films. Lucasfilm executive Rayne Roberts was co-developing the series with Headland, who was influenced by the games and novels of the Star Wars Expanded Universe. The Acolyte consists of eight episodes. In February 2023, Alex Garcia Lopez and Kogonada were hired to direct episodes of the series. In March 2023, Karyn McCarthy sued Lucasfilm over breach of contract following a few weeks of work for the series in April 2022.

Writing 
Headland assembled a writers room for the series by June 2021, with the group each having different relationships with the franchise such as only being fans of the original trilogy, specifically being fans of Dave Filoni's Star Wars projects, or not being fans of the series at all. Charmaine DeGraté served as a writer, while Cameron Squires was a staff writer on the series. In May 2022, Headland said writing for the series was mostly complete. She said the "female-centric" series would have a female protagonist, but would not exclude male characters or audiences. She also explained that the series would be introducing new characters and canon to the franchise that she hoped would interest existing fans, but she understood that not all fans would like it and felt that was fine due to the large amount of different Star Wars projects being produced.

Headland's pitch for the series was to explore the franchise from the perspective of the villains, and felt the High Republic era would be the best point in the timeline to do this because "the bad guys are wildly outnumbered [at that point and are] the underdogs". Lucasfilm had just launched a new series of books set in the High Republic era, and were interested in exploring it further with the series. The company was also interested in exploring new parts of the Star Wars timeline away from the films and other series such as The Mandalorian. Headland said the series would explore the "political, personal, and spiritual" elements from the High Republic era. This was a way to explain how Emperor Palpatine could infiltrate the Galactic Senate during the films, with Headland asking "How did we get to a point where a Sith lord can infiltrate the Senate and none of the Jedi pick up on it? [What] went wrong?" She described the High Republic era as "the Renaissance, or the Age of Enlightenment", and noted that the Jedi Order would not yet be the "ascetic monk like figures living selflessly and bravely" that they are seen as in the films, instead wearing "uniforms [that] are gold and white, and it's almost like they would never get dirty... that's how little they're getting into skirmishes".

Headland looked at the original influences on Star Wars creator George Lucas, including westerns and Akira Kurosawa samurai films, and decided to take more influence for the series from martial arts films which she felt were "a little bit more personal and less global and galactic". These included wuxia films by King Hu and Shaw Brothers Studio such as Come Drink with Me (1966) and A Touch of Zen (1971).

Casting 
Casting for the series was underway by the end of June 2021, with Lucasfilm looking to cast a young woman of color in the lead role. By December 2021, Amandla Stenberg was in talks to star in the role, and was confirmed to be cast in July 2022. In September 2022, Jodie Turner-Smith entered final negotiations to join the series, and Lee Jung-jae was cast as the male lead, while Manny Jacinto and Charlie Barnett were cast in undisclosed roles. In November, Dafne Keen, Rebecca Henderson, Charlie Barnett, Dean-Charles Chapman and Carrie-Anne Moss joined the cast in undisclosed roles. In December, Margarita Levieva joined the cast in an undisclosed role.

Design 
Discussing the planned aesthetic for the series, Headland noted that Lucas wanted the original trilogy to have "this particular type of decay... this is a lived-in sci-fi fantasy world, not a sleek, well-put-together" one, but he made the prequel trilogy "much sleeker, better-looking, almost  advanced". With The Acolyte, Headland wanted to carry on this concept of "the further you go back, the more exciting and new and sleek and interesting things look".

Filming 
Principal photography began by October 30, 2022, at Shinfield Studios in the United Kingdom, under the working title Paradox, with Headland, Garcia Lopez, and Kogonada directing episodes of the series, using the StageCraft technology. From mid to late March 2023, filming is taking place on Madeira Island, Portugal.

Release 
The series will consist of eight episodes and be released on Disney+ in 2024.

References

External links
 
 

2020s American drama television series
2020s American television series debuts
Disney+ original programming
English-language television shows
Productions using StageCraft
Star Wars television series
Space adventure television series
Upcoming drama television series
Upcoming television series
Live action television shows based on films